The Hyundai Reina is a subcompact sedan manufactured in China by Hyundai through the Beijing Hyundai joint venture. The Reina went on sale in September 2017 in China and is the first car produced in Beijing Hyundai's Chongqing plant. Hyundai positioned the Reina slightly under the Verna in the country.

Reina is a Spanish word for queen. Since 2019, the Reina is sold as the Hyundai Verna in Latin American markets such as Costa Rica, Chile and Peru.

Overview 

The Hyundai Reina made its debut at the 2017 Chongqing Motor Show. Based on the PB platform used in the Hyundai Accent/Verna, the Reina stands on a  wheelbase and has a trunk capacity of 475 liters. Powering the car is a 1.4-liter Kappa MPI I4 engine that generates  and  torque to the front wheels.

The Reina was released in the Philippines in March 2019. It replaces the Eon when launched in the country.

References

External links 

 
 (Philippines)

Cars introduced in 2017
Cars of China
Front-wheel-drive vehicles
Reina
Subcompact cars